Demetrio may refer to:

 Demetrio, a variant of the name Demetrius
 Demetrio (Metastasio),  an opera libretto in three acts by Pietro Metastasio
 Demetrio (1773), set by Josef Mysliveček
 Demetrio (1779), reset by Josef Mysliveček
 Demetrio (Mayr), set by Simon Mayr

See also 
 Demetrius (disambiguation)
 San Demetrio (disambiguation)